The 2001–02 NBA season was the Clippers' 32nd season in the National Basketball Association and their 18th season in Los Angeles. The Clippers selected high school basketball star Tyson Chandler with the second overall pick in the 2001 NBA draft, but soon traded him to the Chicago Bulls in exchange for Elton Brand. With the acquisition of Brand and the continued improvements of second-year guard Quentin Richardson, Corey Maggette and Michael Olowokandi, the Clippers played their best basketball with a 15–11 start as of December 22. The team began to slip under .500, but still played competitive basketball through most of the first half holding a 25–26 record at the All-Star break, despite Lamar Odom only playing just 29 games due to a wrist injury, and second-year guard Keyon Dooling only playing just 14 games due to an ankle injury. However, after holding a 36–33 record in mid-March, the Clippers struggled and lost 10 of their final 13 games. They failed to make the playoffs finishing fifth in the Pacific Division with a 39–43 record, which was ninth place in the Western Conference.

Brand averaged 18.2 points, 11.6 rebounds and 2.0 blocks per game, and was selected for the 2002 NBA All-Star Game, while Jeff McInnis provided the team with 14.6 points and 6.2 assists per game, and Richardson played an increased role as the team's sixth man, averaging 13.3 points per game off the bench. In addition, Maggette contributed 11.4 points per game, while Odom averaged 13.1 points, 6.1 rebounds and 5.9 assists per game, Olowokandi provided with 11.1 points, 8.9 rebounds and 1.8 blocks per game, and second-year forward Darius Miles averaged 9.5 points, 5.5 rebounds and 1.3 blocks per game off the bench. Richardson also finished in third place in Sixth Man of the Year voting.

Following the season, Miles was traded to the Cleveland Cavaliers, and McInnis signed as a free agent with the Portland Trail Blazers.

Draft picks

Roster

Roster Notes
 The Clippers received shooting guard Vinny Del Negro from the Phoenix Suns in a trade early in the season, but he did not play for the team as he was quickly waived. He did come back and became the team's head coach from 2010-2013.

Regular season

Season standings

Record vs. opponents

Game log

Player statistics

Player Statistics Citation:

Awards, records and milestones

All-Star 
Elton Brand selected as a reserve forward for the Western Conference All-Stars. Brand was chosen as a replacement for the injured Shaquille O'Neal on the roster. He is the first Clipper All-Star since Danny Manning was selected in 1994.

Transactions
The Clippers were involved in the following transactions during the 2001–02 season.

Trades

Free agents

Additions

Subtractions

Player Transactions Citation:

References

Los Angeles Clippers seasons